Silonia is a genus of schilbid catfishes native to Asia.

Species
There are currently two recognized species in this genus:
 Silonia childreni (Sykes, 1839)
 Silonia silondia (Hamilton, 1822) (Silond catfish)

References

Schilbeidae
Catfish genera
Fish of India
Fish of Bangladesh
Fish of Nepal
Freshwater fish genera
Taxa named by William John Swainson